Oswald David Heck (February 13, 1902 – May 21, 1959) was an American lawyer and politician. To date he has been the longest-serving Speaker of the New York State Assembly, and he was the last Speaker from Upstate New York.

Life
He was born on February 13, 1902, in Schenectady, New York. In 1933, he married Beulah W. Slocum.

He was a member of the New York State Assembly in 1932, 1933, 1934, 1935, 1936, 1937, 1938, 1939–40, 1941–42, 1943–44, 1945–46, 1947–48, 1949–50, 1951–52, 1953–54, 1955–56, 1957–58 and 1959; and was Majority Leader in 1936, and Speaker from 1937 until his death in 1959.

He was a delegate to the 1944, 1948, 1952 and 1956 Republican National Conventions.

He died on May 21, 1959, in Schenectady, New York, of a heart attack; and was buried at the Vale Cemetery there.

His 21-year-old son Peter Heck died on July 17, 1960, in Glens Falls Hospital, in Glens Falls, New York, after a car accident.

His daughter Penelope Heck Crannell died February 3, 1979, at St. Clares Hospital in Schenectady, NY of liver cancer.

References

Sources
 Political Graveyard
 Obit notice in TIME magazine on June 1, 1959

1902 births
1959 deaths
Speakers of the New York State Assembly
Republican Party members of the New York State Assembly
Politicians from Schenectady, New York
20th-century American politicians